Wildermuth is a German surname derived from the German word "wild" meaning "wild," and the element "muth," which comes from the Old High German "muot" meaning "to desire". Notable people with the surname include:
 Hermann-Eberhard Wildermuth (1890–1952), German politician and a member of the FDP/DVP
 Jack Wildermuth (1993), Australian cricketer
 Katharina Wildermuth (1979), German rhythmic gymnast
 Ottilie Wildermuth (1817–1877), German writer

German-language surnames
Surnames from nicknames